Zhao Shuai (born 28 November 1994) is a Chinese para table tennis player. He won the C8 singles at the 2012 Summer Paralympics, and defended his title four years later at the 2016 Summer Paralympics. At the 2020 Summer Paralympics he won two gold medals.

Zhao's left arm was amputated when he was four years old, following a car accident.

References

1994 births
Living people
Table tennis players at the 2016 Summer Paralympics
Table tennis players at the 2012 Summer Paralympics
Paralympic medalists in table tennis
Medalists at the 2016 Summer Paralympics
Medalists at the 2012 Summer Paralympics
Chinese male table tennis players
Paralympic gold medalists for China
Paralympic table tennis players of China
Table tennis players from Hebei
Chinese amputees
People from Yu County, Hebei
Table tennis players at the 2020 Summer Paralympics